Whistling in Brooklyn is a 1943 film directed by S. Sylvan Simon and starring Red Skelton, Ann Rutherford, and Jean Rogers. It is the third and last film starring Skelton as radio personality and amateur detective Wally "The Fox" Benton, following Whistling in the Dark and Whistling in Dixie. Leo Durocher, then-manager of the Brooklyn Dodgers, made his screen debut, playing himself, while Dodgers "superfan" Hilda Chester also made a brief appearance, playing herself.

Plot
Wally prepares to marry his girlfriend, but gets sidetracked when he is mistaken for a serial killer.

Cast
 Red Skelton as Wally Benton
 Ann Rutherford as Carol Lambert
 Jean Rogers as Jean Pringle
 Rags Ragland as Chester Conway
 Ray Collins as Grover Kendall
 Henry O'Neill as Inspector Holcomb
 William Frawley as Detective Ramsey
 Sam Levene as Creeper
 Arthur Space as Detective MacKenzie
 Robert Emmett O'Connor as Detective Leo Finnigan
 Steve Geray as Whitey
 Howard Freeman as Steve Conlon
 Mike Mazurki as thug
 Lillian Yarbo as Maid (uncredited)

References

External links
 
 
 
 

1943 films
1940s crime comedy films
1940s comedy mystery films
1940s serial killer films
American crime comedy films
American black-and-white films
Films about radio people
Films directed by S. Sylvan Simon
Films set in Brooklyn
Metro-Goldwyn-Mayer films
American comedy films
1943 comedy films
1940s American films